The 2019–20 Dream11 Super Smash (named after the competition's sponsor Dream11) was the fifteenth season of the Men's Super Smash Twenty20 cricket tournament in New Zealand. It took place between December 2019 and January 2020. The Central Stags were the defending champions.

On 5 January 2020, in the match between the Canterbury Kings and the Northern Knights, Leo Carter hit six sixes in one over off the bowling of Anton Devcich. He was the fourth batsman to do this in a Twenty20 match, and the first by a New Zealand cricketer.

On 11 January 2020, the Otago Volts became the first team to qualify for the knockout section of the tournament, after they beat the Central Stags by nine wickets. The following day, the Auckland Aces and the Wellington Firebirds also confirmed their spots in the knockout stage of the competition. Wellington finished top of the table after the final group stage match, advancing directly to the final. Otago and Auckland advanced to the preliminary final, after finishing second and third respectively.

In the preliminary final, the Auckland Aces beat the Otago Volts by three wickets to join the Wellington Firebirds in the final. Wellington won the tournament, after they beat Auckland by 22 runs in the final.

Points table

 Advanced to the Final
 Advanced to the Preliminary Final

Fixtures

Round-robin

Finals

References

External links
 Series home at ESPN Cricinfo

2019–20 New Zealand cricket season
Super Smash
Super Smash (cricket)